Michael Nathe (born September 19, 1963) is an American politician. He is a member of the North Dakota House of Representatives from the 30th District, serving since 2008. He is a member of the Republican party.

References

Living people
Republican Party members of the North Dakota House of Representatives
1956 births
21st-century American politicians